Constanza is a town and municipality in La Vega Province, Dominican Republic. 
Located in the Cordillera Central region, Constanza is known for having the coldest temperature for a settlement on the island of Hispaniola, as well as the entire Caribbean.

History
The name of Constanza has its origin in the legend the daughter of a local Taíno chief who lived in the valley. Constanza was a sparsely populated area, though several explorers knew the valley in colonial times, and there was a settler named Victoriano Velano who brought European agriculture and ranching culture to the area in 1750.

In 1852, the German-British explorer and consul Sir Robert Hermann Schomburgk mentions the existence of a farm in the valley of Constanza. The town was formally founded in 1894. It was incorporated into a municipality in La Vega Province on September 9, 1907.

On June 14, 1959, a plane landed on an Constanza airstrip with more than forty Cuban-trained rebels, with the purpose of killing the then-dictator Rafael Trujillo. They fought guerrilla warfare in the nearby mountains against the Dominican Army for two months before the armed forces managed to end the rebellion.

Geography
The town of Constanza is located at a height of 1220 meters (4000 ft) above sea level in the middle of the Cordillera Central (Central Range). Annual average temperatures range from 41 °F (5 °C) to 68 °F (20 °C), depending on altitude. The valley is 8 km long and 4 km wide.

Climate 

Its climate is a temperate oceanic or subtropical highland climate (Köppen Climate Classification Cwb), with cool temperatures and rainfall throughout the year. The average annual temperature varies from less than 10 °C in highlands to 18 °C in town.

In summer, temperatures range between 25 °C to 27 °C during the day, and between 12 °C to 15 °C at night. Wildfires are relatively common. In winter, the temperatures are between 21 and 24 °C at day, and 8 to 12 °C at night. Fog is quite common. The last time that Constanza had freezing temperatures was on 1958; while in Valle Nuevo freezes are usual. 

The highest temperature ever recorded in town was 32.5 °C, on October 3, 1957. The coldest temperature was –1 °C, recorded on February 6, 1958.

Economy

The local economy is based on its robust agricultural industry. It has a high production of vegetables and fruits including strawberries, peaches, apples, garlic and potato and other temperate crops due to its unique climate. The town of Constanza alone contributes to 4% of the national GDP, while only having 0.6252% of the Dominican population making it one of the most prosperous municipalities in the country per capita.

Tourism
Constanza is known for its remarkable mountain climate despite being located in a tropical island. Local tourism is very often during winter time. Throughout the rest of the year it is visited because of its closeness to the scientific reserve of Ebano Verde and also to have the nearest route to the Pico Duarte, the tallest mountain in the Caribbean.

Ecology
The nearby scientific reserve of Ebano Verde is the stronghold of the widest variety of flora and fauna of Hispaniola. The mountains surrounding the valley of Constanza are covered in Hispaniolan pine (Pinus occidentalis) forests. Typical fauna seen in the area includes the Hispaniolan palm crow, Antillean siskin, rufous-throated solitaire, Hispaniolan crossbill (abundance directly related to pine cone crop), and Hispaniolan trogon, while at lower elevations the Hispaniolan parrot, scaly-naped pigeon and golden swallow can be seen.

Transportation
The town can be reached either by local airlines through the Constanza Airport or through local bus companies.

Demographics

Constanza has 59,052 inhabitants. A large part of its population descends from Spanish immigrants (from Burgos, Palencia and Vizcaya), Hungarians, Japanese, as well as a smaller number of Arabs, Jews, and Chinese. The migrants of Constanza usually lived in neighborhoods where they live retained the customs of their ancestors. The three most prominent and particular colonies are the Spanish Colony, a few meters from the entrance of the city, the Hungarian Colony, to the southeast, and the Japanese Colony, to the south on the road that leads to Valle Nuevo and San José de Ocoa.

References

Populated places in La Vega Province
Municipalities of the Dominican Republic
1894 establishments in North America